Kultaranta is the summer residence of the president of Finland. It is in the district of Kultaranta on the island of Luonnonmaa, in Naantali.

The President of the Republic's summer residence, Kultaranta, stands in 54-hectare grounds in Naantali on the southwest coast. As well as the granite-built house, the complex includes numerous outbuildings and greenhouses, and a park.

Kultaranta's original owner was the businessman Alfred Kordelin, who had a manor house built for himself in 1914. It was designed by the architect Lars Sonck. When Kordelin died in 1917 the manor's ownership shifted to the University of Turku and, in 1922, the Finnish Parliament voted to acquire it for use as the president's summer residence.

The ground floor contains the reception rooms and private apartments. Upstairs are the bedrooms and guestrooms. Marble steps lead from the ground floor to the tower, from which there are views of Naantali and the inshore islands.

The parks around the manor, containing approximately a thousand square metres of greenhouse and a garden with 3,500 roses called Medaljonki ('medallion'), are open to the public. The scent and colour of these roses are at their peak in the middle of the summer, when the President and family and their guests come to Naantali for the holidays.  Tours in the garden are organised by the City of Naantali's tourist service.

Kultaranta's Park has been described as a "mini-Versailles". The parkland to the north of Kultaranta is in practically a natural state, though a few sandy pathways have been built there, and the woodland is kept in good condition.

The garden supplies the President's household with both flowers and vegetables all year round.

Gallery

See also 
 Kesäranta
 Mäntyniemi

References

Further reading

External links 
Kultaranta , with pictures (in English)

Presidential residences
Official residences in Finland
Manor houses in Finland
Palaces in Finland
Gardens in Finland
Naantali
Buildings and structures in Southwest Finland
Lars Sonck buildings
National Romantic architecture in Finland
Art Nouveau houses
Art Nouveau government buildings
Houses completed in 1914